"Together Again" is a single by Canadian country music artist Hank Smith. The song debuted at number 49 on the RPM Country Tracks chart on January 22, 1972. It peaked at number 1 on May 27, 1972.

Chart performance

References

1972 singles
Hank Smith (singer) songs
1972 songs
Quality Records singles
Song articles with missing songwriters